Saudade (サウダージ) is the fourth single by the Japanese pop-rock band Porno Graffitti, it was released on September 13, 2000.

"Saudade" means in Portuguese such as "Nostalgia" , "Melancholy" , "Emotions Feeling Lost" , essentially the feeling of missing happy times or events that were frequent in the past.

Track listing

References

2000 singles
Porno Graffitti songs
2000 songs
SME Records singles
Oricon Weekly number-one singles